The fourth season of Saturday Night Live, an American sketch comedy series, originally aired in the United States on NBC between October 7, 1978, and May 26, 1979.

The season 4 DVD was released on December 2, 2008.

Cast
The entire cast from the previous season returned. The only change was Bill Murray's joining Jane Curtin as co-anchor for Weekend Update, replacing Dan Aykroyd. This would be the final season for Dan Aykroyd and John Belushi as cast members (who both left to work on SNL's first film, The Blues Brothers).

Cast roster

Repertory players
Dan Aykroyd
John Belushi
Jane Curtin
Garrett Morris
Bill Murray
Laraine Newman
Gilda Radner

Featured players
Tom Davis
Al Franken

bold denotes Weekend Update anchor

Writers

Walter Williams, creator of the Mr. Bill shorts, joined the writing staff.

This season's writers were Dan Aykroyd, Anne Beatts, Tom Davis, Jim Downey, Brian Doyle-Murray, Al Franken, Brian McConnachie, Lorne Michaels, Don Novello, Herb Sargent, Tom Schiller, Rosie Shuster, Walter Williams and Alan Zweibel. The head writer was Herb Sargent.

Episodes

See also
 Recurring SNL characters and sketches introduced in season 4
 History of Saturday Night Live (1975–1980)

References

04
Saturday Night Live in the 1970s
1978 American television seasons
1979 American television seasons